Imi, according to the Sumerian King List, was one of four rivals (the others being Igigi, Ilulu, and Nanum) vying to be king of the Akkadian Empire during a three-year period following the death of Shar-kali-sharri. This chaotic period came to an end when Dudu consolidated his power over the realm.

See also

 History of Mesopotamia

Notes 

22nd-century BC kings of Akkad
Sumerian kings
Akkadian people